Chay Sudan (also Romanized as Chāy Sūdān; also known as Chāh Sūdān, Chūl, ‘Omūr, and Sūdān Chāy) is a village in Abdoliyeh-ye Sharqi Rural District, in the Central District of Ramshir County, Khuzestan Province, Iran. At the 2006 census, its population was 70, in 13 families.

References 

Populated places in Ramshir County